Jeffrey Harris (born Akaroa, 1949) is a New Zealand artist. Harris started his career in Christchurch, moving to Dunedin, New Zealand in 1969. In the early 1980s he worked briefly in the United States, before moving to Melbourne, Australia in 1986. In 2000 he returned to Dunedin, where he still lives. Largely self-taught, but mentored by notable New Zealand artists such as Michael Smither and Ralph Hotere, he has painted full-time since 1970.

Early life 
Harris was born in Akaroa and grew up on Banks Peninsula on his parents' farm. He attended high school in Rangiora, then worked in Christchurch for three years. He went to Dunedin so he could learn from Michael Smither, with whom he stayed for a year. He never went to art school but was influenced by artists such as Francis Bacon and his Crucifixions; his primary early inspiration came from art books.

Style 
Harris's works are mainly large expressionistic canvases depicting family groups in daily situations. These works, based to a large extent on the artist's own life, often have strong symbolic meanings for the artist. From the mid-1980s until the turn of the century, Harris began producing powerful monochromatic abstracts – these works coincided with the period when Harris was working in Australia. Since his return to Dunedin, Harris's work has turned back to his earlier figurative styles, though often concentrating more on religious iconography such as the Crucifixion rather than domestic scenes.

Honours and awards
Harris became the University of Otago's 1977 Frances Hodgkins Fellow, and in 2003 won the James Wallace Art Award, New Zealand's top art award. This award's prize included a one-year residency.

A book on Harris's art by Justin Paton (simply titled Jeffrey Harris) became a finalist in the 2006 Montana New Zealand Book Awards. Alongside the book, a major retrospective exhibition toured five of New Zealand's major public galleries from 2004 to 2006.

Notes

References

Further reading 
Paton, J. (2006) Jeffrey Harris. Wellington: Victoria University Press.

External links 
Dunedin City Council Jeffrey Harris page
Jeffrey Harris in the collection of the Museum of New Zealand Te Papa Tongarewa
Gallery of Harris's art at nz-artists
Milford Galleries' Jeffrey Harris Major Paintings From The Survey Tour & Other Key Works, Milford Galleries, Auckland

People from Akaroa
Artists from Dunedin
1949 births
Living people